Daniel Risch (born 5 March 1978) is a Liechtensteiner politician, and the incumbent Prime Minister of Liechtenstein. He was previously Deputy Prime Minister and Minister of Infrastructure, Economic Affairs and Sports from 2017 to 2021, under the government of Adrian Hasler.

Early career 
Risch previously attended Liechtenstein Grammar School in Vaduz from 1990 to 1998, and received a business baccalaureate. He later studied business administration at the Swiss universities of St. Gallen and Zurich, as well as the Ludwig-Maximilian University in Munich from 1999 to 2003. He graduated with a degree in economics (lic. oec. publ.) from the University of Zurich.

Risch then started doctoral studies in business informatics at the University of Freiburg in 2004, and from 2006 to 2007 was a visiting scholar at the University of Melbourne as part of a research stay. He completed his studies at Freiburg in 2007 and received a doctorate in economics (dr. rer. pol.).

From 2007, he was the Project Manager, Head of Sales and Chief Marketing Officer at Unic AG, an e-business consulting company, in Zurich and Bern. From 2015 until entering government in 2017, he worked as Chief Marketing Officer at Liechtensteinische Post.

From 2015 to 2017, he was a board member at a Liechtensteiner forum for information and communications technology (IKT Forum Liechtenstein).

Political career 
Since 2016, Risch has been a member of the presidium of the liberal-conservative Patriotic Union (VU). Following the 2017 Liechtenstein general election, he was nominated as Deputy Prime Minister in a coalition government with the national-conservative Progressive Citizens' Party (FBP). As Deputy Prime Minister, he also served as Minister of Infrastructure, Economic Affairs and Sports. He eventually became Prime Minister following the 2021 general election, heading a new coalition government with the FBP's Sabine Monauni.

Personal life 
Since 2009, Risch has been a member of the Founding Committee, Organising Committee and Patronage Body of the FL1.LIFE festival in Schaan. He is married to Jasmin Schädler (born 20 October 1974) and has two children.

References

External links 
Daniel Risch at the official website of the government of Liechtenstein.

1978 births
Heads of government of Liechtenstein
Living people
Patriotic Union (Liechtenstein) politicians
Economy ministers of Liechtenstein
Infrastructures ministers of Liechtenstein
Sports ministers of Liechtenstein
University of St. Gallen alumni
University of Zurich alumni
Ludwig Maximilian University of Munich alumni
University of Freiburg alumni
People from St. Gallen (city)
Deputy Prime Ministers of Liechtenstein